The 1957 Colorado State Rams football team represented Colorado State University in the Skyline Conference during the 1957 NCAA University Division football season.  In their second season under head coach Don Mullison, the Rams compiled a 3–7 record (2–5 against Skyline opponents), tied for sixth place in the Skyline Conference, and were outscored by opponents by a total of 224 to 109.

The team's statistical leaders included Louie Long with 328 passing yards and Frank Gupton with 540 rushing yards and 162 receiving yards.

Schedule

References

Colorado State
Colorado State Rams football seasons
Colorado State Rams football